The following table shows the tallest buildings in Paraguay. The heights, in metre, are considered from street level to the maximum structural height, call it water tanks, elevator boxes, etc., without considering telecommunication antennas.

Built skyscrapers 

(¹) - The heights, in m, are considered from street level to the maximum structural height, including water tanks, elevator boxes, etc., but without considering telecommunication antennas.

Skyscrapers under construction

References

Tallest
Paraguay
Paraguay